The Akizuki clan (秋月氏, Akizuki-shi) is a Japanese noble family. In the Sengoku period, the Akizuki clan was led by a samurai lord (大名 daimyō) in the Akizuki domain on the island of Kyūshū. From the Meiji period to the end of World War II, the Akizuki family was a contemporary noble  (華族 "Kazoku"). After World War II, the land controlled by the Akizuki family became Akizuki prefecture. Later, Akizuki prefecture was re-organized as Fukuoka Prefecture (福岡県 Fukuoka-ken).

At present, the former Akizuki area is still referred to as "Akizuki", and is now Asakura, Fukuoka prefecture. The Akizuki clan's main descendants live in Ōita Prefecture and Tokyo.

Notable leader
Akizuki Kiyotane
Akizuki Tanezane (1548-1596)
Akizuki Tanenaga (1567-1614)
Akizuki Taneharu

Cultural references

The movie director Akira Kurosawa directed a movie about the Akizuki clan, called The Hidden Fortress (隠し砦の三悪人 Kakushi-toride-no-san-akunin), in 1958. In the film, the clan crest is depicted as a crescent. The Hidden Fortress was remade in 2008 by director Shinji Higuchi.

References

Japanese nobility
Japanese people of Chinese descent